USNS Cheyenne (T-AG-174) was a  acquired by the U.S. Navy in 1962, crewed by a civilian crew from the Military Sea Transportation Service, and sent to the Philippines to serve as a delivery ship of parts and supplies to other navy ships and stations in the Asian area. Cheyenne remained in the Philippines, issuing parts and other supplies, until the late 1960s.  In 1966 she changed home port to Pusan Korea and was manned by Korean merchant seaman.  AT that time she was one of 4 cargo ships and 19 USNS LSTs operating out of the MSTS Office Pusan primarily providing support in the Viet Nam theater.  Her master was a former ROK Navy captain, best known as "Speedy Pak".  She was struck by the navy in 1973.  (Korea information provided by the executive officer of the MSTS Office Pusan 1967–68.)

Built in Portland, Oregon 
Cheyenne was constructed as the victory ship SS Middlesex Victory under U.S. Maritime Commission contract (MCV-693) at Oregon Shipbuilding Corporation, Portland, Oregon. She was launched on 26 June 1945 and renamed SS Wyoming in 1947. In 1963, she was placed in-service as USNS Cheyenne (T-AG-174), a Special Project Ship, manned by the Military Sea Transportation Service with a civilian crew.

World War II
For World War II the Middlesex Victory was operated by the Pacific-Atlantic Steamship Company under charter with the Maritime Commission and War Shipping Administration. She took needed supplies to troops. In 1948 she was sold to the States Steamship Company of Tacoma and renamed SS Wyoming.

Vietnam War operations
DANFS has no information on the operation of this ship.

Post-war decommissioning
Along with Phoenix and Provo, Cheyenne was struck from the Navy List on 15 June 1973 and disposed of by MARAD sale, 1 May 1973 and scrapped in August.

References
 NavSource Online: Service Ship Photo Archive - T-AG-174 Cheyenne
 
 

 

Victory ships
Ships built in Portland, Oregon
1945 ships
World War II merchant ships of the United States
Phoenix-class auxiliary ships
Vietnam War auxiliary ships of the United States